Sir Philip William Burne-Jones, 2nd Baronet (1 October 1861 – 21 June 1926) was the first child of the British Pre-Raphaelite artist Sir Edward Burne-Jones and his wife Georgiana Macdonald. He became a well-known painter in his own right, producing more than 60 paintings, including portraits, landscapes, and poetic fantasies.

Life and career
He was born in London, England in 1861 and was educated at Marlborough College. He attended Oxford University for two years, but quit. To appease his parents for this failure, he agreed to take lessons in painting in London.

Philip did study painting seriously. His skill was great and he exhibited his work in well-known galleries in London and Paris. The Royal Academy exhibited his work eleven times between 1898 and 1918, and his work was also shown in the Paris Salon of 1900. There he exhibited his portrait of his father, now in the National Portrait Gallery. He painted portraits of many well-known persons of the time.

His most famous work, The Vampire (1897), depicting a woman leaning over an unconscious man, was believed to have been modelled by the actress Mrs Patrick Campbell, with whom Burne-Jones had been associated romantically. The painting also inspired his cousin Rudyard Kipling's poem of the same name. The location of the original painting is unknown. In July 1902 several papers including the Baltimore Sun and the St. Louis Republic reported the painting was sold to W.K. Vanderbilt; however, Burne-Jones denied the reports. 

Having a famous father was difficult for him, and it was Philip's fate in life that his work was often compared unfavourably with that of his father.

Upon his father's death in 1898, Philip succeeded to the title of baronet that had been bestowed on his father during 1894. It is said that his father had accepted the title only because Philip was keen to inherit it.

Philip visited the United States during 1902, where he was popular in fashionable society and contributed to the then-fashionable travelogue literary genre by publishing an account (Dollars and Democracy) of his time spent there. He lived most of his life in London, where he died in 1926.

Racial views
Philip expressed racist remarks on Black Americans in his 1904 American travelogue "Dollars and Democracy." Frankly confessing that he does not think highly of African Americans and is skeptical of their belonging in American society, Philip wrote that "among a highly civilized and strenuous people the negroes are in an absolutely false position," "the negro is not, and can never be, the equal of his white brother," and considering "exceptions here and there, the best that can be said for them [African Americans] is that they make tolerably good servants." Burne-Jones did make allowances for the possibility of his racist opinions on this matter being wrong, asking at the end of his anti-black diatribe if "I've been very unfair in what I've just said?"

References

External links

  Burne-Jones, Philip (1902) Catalogue of Works, Exhibited at M. Knoedler & Co., 355 Fifth Avenue, NYC, from 17 March 1902 to 29 March 1902, via: Internet Archive, included Vampire.
  Burne-Jones, Philip (1904) Dollars and democracy, memoir about 1902 US travels, via: Internet Archive
 
Philip Burne-Jones exhibition catalog
 

1861 births
1926 deaths
Baronets in the Baronetage of the United Kingdom
People educated at Marlborough College
19th-century English painters
English male painters
20th-century English painters
Painters from London
Burne-Jones family
20th-century English male artists
19th-century English male artists